The following is a list of presidents of San Luis Potosí municipality, Mexico.

See also
 
 San Luis Potosí history

References

San Luis Potosí City
San Luis Potosí City

San Luis Potosí
History of San Luis Potosí
San Luis Potosí Municipality